Plataforma de Afectados por la Hipoteca (PAH; Platform for People Affected by Mortgages) is a Spanish grassroots organization that takes direct action to stop evictions and campaigns for housing rights. The PAH was set up in Barcelona in February 2009 and by 2017 had 220 local branches across Spain. It was established in response to the 2008 financial crisis that triggered the bursting of the Spanish housing bubble and resists evictions due to foreclosures.

Activity and campaigns

The Plataforma de Afectados por la Hipoteca (PAH, Platform for People Affected by Mortgages) was set up in Barcelona in February 2009, by activists previously involved in V de Vivienda (H for Housing). The group aimed to protest and combat the foreclosures which were evicting people from their homes. It is organised horizontally by assembly and grew exponentially across Spain, with 220 local groups recorded by 2017. The group organises non-violent resistance to evictions and campaigns for a social rent and more aid for people unable to pay their mortgages. The PAH had successfully stopped more than 2,000 evictions by 2016.

Ada Colau was one of the founding members of the PAH, acting as its spokesperson until May 2014. Since June 2014, Colau has been a spokesperson for citizen platform Guanyem Barcelona (Let's Win Back Barcelona). She won a simple majority in the elections and on 13 June 2015 she became Mayor of Barcelona for Barcelona en Comú.

PAH achieved notoriety for its practice of "escraches" in which the homes and offices of politicians were visited. Mariano Rajoy, the Spanish Prime Minister condemned escraches as "undemocratic" and María Dolores de Cospedal, Secretary-General of the People's Party called them "pure Nazism". A lawyer representing PAH commented "We don’t like to carry out escraches but they've left us with no other choice".

Awards
In 2013, PAH received the Premio Nacional de Derechos Humanos, a national award for human rights. It also received the European Citizens' Prize.

See also
 Subprime mortgage crisis

References

Further reading

External links
 Official website

Organizations established in 2009
Squatters' movements
Housing in Spain
Squatting in Spain
Civil disobedience
2009 establishments in Spain